Placogobio is a genus of cyprinid fish endemic to Vietnam.  There are two described species in the genus.

Species
 Placogobio bacmeensis V. H. Nguyễn & V. B. Vo, 2001
 Placogobio nahangensis V. H. Nguyễn, 2001

References
 

Cyprinidae genera
Cyprinid fish of Asia
Fish of Vietnam